Vladimir Malozemlin is a Soviet Olympic middle-distance runner. He represented his country in the men's 1500 meters at the 1980 Summer Olympics. His time was a 3:38.68 in the first heat, and a 3:43.56 in the semifinals.

References 

1956 births
Living people
Soviet male middle-distance runners
Olympic athletes of the Soviet Union
Athletes (track and field) at the 1980 Summer Olympics